PNE AG (formerly Plambeck Neue Energie AG) is a German company based in Cuxhaven. It is developing wind farms on land and at sea (offshore).

The business model of PNE AG includes planning, building, financing, operating and selling of wind farms. The company is active in Germany as well as in countries such as Hungary, France, Turkey and USA.

The Company received the permission for the first own offshore project "Borkum Reef Ground" approximately four years after examination by the competent Bundesamt für Seeschifffahrt und Hydrographie (Federal Maritime and Hydrographic Agency) in February 2004. In August 2006 the construction of the offshore wind farm "Gode Wind I" was permitted. The permission for the offshore wind farm "Gode Wind II" was granted in July 2009. Thus, the company may set up approximately 160 wind turbines in the North Sea with a total capacity of up to 637 MW. Another offshore wind farm "Gode Wind III" is in development and has been sold along with the wind farm Gode Wind I-II to the Danish energy company DONG Energy.

Until December 2010 PNE had built 97 onshore wind farms with 563 wind turbines and a total capacity of 804 MW. 299 wind turbines with a total capacity of 462 MW and 2 biogas plants with a total of 1 MW were in the operational management.

The stock ticker is PNE3.DE.

History 

1979 Norbert Plambeck and his father Otto Plambeck founded a group of companies. This group included the "Windpark Marschland GmbH" in 1995, which changed its name in 1998 to Plambeck Neue Energien AG as a company limited by shares (Aktiengesellschaft).

Wolfgang von Geldern accompanied Norbert Plambeck during the Initial public offering and belonged to the Board from 1998 until 2008.

In August 2019 Morgan Stanley Infrastructure announced an offer at €4 per share or €306m to acquire PNE AG.  The supervisory board of PNE AG agreed to the offer in October 2019.  A great number of PNE AG's shareholders disagreed with the offer, sighting the offer as too low. As of November 15th 2019 Morgan Stanley Infrastructure amassed a 21.9% stake in PNE AG.

References

External links

Cuxhaven
Wind power companies of Germany
Companies based in Lower Saxony
German brands